48 (forty-eight)  is the natural number following 47 and preceding 49. It is one third of a gross, or four dozens.

In mathematics 

Forty-eight is the double factorial of 6, a highly composite number. Like all other multiples of 6, it is a semiperfect number. 48 is the second 17-gonal number.

48 is the smallest number with exactly ten divisors.

There are 11 solutions to the equation φ(x) = 48, namely 65, 104, 105, 112, 130, 140, 144, 156, 168, 180 and 210. This is more than any integer below 48, making 48 a highly totient number.

Since the greatest prime factor of 482 + 1 = 2305 is 461, which is clearly more than twice 48, 48 is a Størmer number.

48 is a Harshad number in base 10. It has 24, 2, 12, and 4 as factors.

In science

The atomic number of cadmium.
The number of Ptolemaic constellations.
The number of symmetries of a cube.

Astronomy

Messier object M48, a magnitude 5.5 open cluster in the constellation Hydra.
The New General Catalogue object NGC 48, a barred spiral galaxy in the constellation Andromeda.

In religion

The prophecies of 48 Jewish prophets and 7 prophetesses were recorded in the Tanakh for posterity.
According to the Mishnah, Torah wisdom is acquired via 48 ways (Pirkei Avoth 6:6).
In Buddhism, Amitabha Buddha had made 48 great vows and promises to provide ultimate salvation to countless beings through countless eons, with benefits said to be available merely by thinking about his name with Nianfo practice. He is thus hailed as "King of Buddhas" through such skillful compassion and became a popular and formal refuge figure in Pureland Buddhism.

In music
 Johann Sebastian Bach's Well-Tempered Clavier is informally known as  because it consists of a prelude and a fugue in each major and minor key, for a total of forty-eight pieces.
 "48" is a song by Sunny Day Real Estate.
 "48" is a song by Tyler, The Creator.
 "Forty eight" is a song by Truckfighters on their 2007 album, Phi.
 "48 Hour Parole" is a song by the Hollies.
 "48 Crash" is a song by Suzi Quatro.
 Familiar 48 is an alternative pop/rock band formerly known as Bonehead.
 On Tool's album Ænima, there is a song named "Forty-Six & 2", the sum of which is 48.
 AKB48 Group is a Japanese female idol group.

In sports
48 is the total number of minutes in a full NBA game.

In other fields 
Forty-eight may also refer to:
 the code for international direct dial phone calls to Poland.
 the model number of the HP-48 S/SX/G/GX/G+/GII.
 the 48 Hour Film Project.
 The First 48, an American crime program, 2004-present.
 48 Hours is a television news program on CBS.
 48 Hrs., a 1982 film starring Nick Nolte and Eddie Murphy, followed by Another 48 Hrs.
 Arizona is the 48th state in the United States.
 The 48 United States (excluding Alaska and Hawaii) are also referred to as the "Lower 48" or the "48 contiguous states".
 '48 is an alternate history novel by James Herbert.
 The 48 Laws of Power is a book by Robert Greene.
 The number 48 in ASCII is what you add to any single digit integer to convert to its ASCII value.
 MAC address uses 48-bit (6-byte).
 The number of the French department Lozère.
 a model of Harley-Davidson in the Sportster line. 
 In Chinese numerology, 48 is an auspicious number meaning 'determined to prosper', or simply 'prosperity', which is good for business.
 48 is the number of mountain peaks in New Hampshire over 4000 feet above sea level, as defined by the Appalachian Mountain Club.
 '48 is a slang term in Palestinian Arabic for parts of Israel or Palestine not under the control of the State of Palestine. Arab people from those parts are colloquially known as 48 Arabs (Arabic: فلسطينيو 48، عرب 48, Filastiniyyū Thamaniya Wa-Arba'in, Arab Thamaniya Wa-Arba'in).

See also
 List of highways numbered 48

References 

Integers